The PGA EuroPro Tour was a men's developmental professional golf tour. It was created in 2002 by the merger of two development tours, the EuroPro Tour and the PGA MasterCard Tour, as the Professional Golfers' Association and Barry Hearn's Matchroom Sport joined forces.

The PGA EuroPro Tour provided professional golfers with an entry point to a career in tournament golf. The top five finishers on the Order of Merit won a tour card for the following season on Europe's second-tier golf tour, the Challenge Tour, and a place at the second stage of the European Tour Qualifying School. Since July 2015, Official World Golf Ranking points were awarded, with four points given to the winner of a tournament.

The tour was based mainly in the United Kingdom, with a few events in other countries. Most of the players were British, with others coming from the Republic of Ireland, Continental Europe and farther afield. In 2020, the total prize money was due to rise to €1 million. Prize funds were around £50,000 each. The winner's share was £12,500. The Tour Championship has a £127,500 prize fund with £25,000 going to the winner 

In September 2022, the tour announced that it would cease operating at the end of the 2022 season.

Television coverage
The tour was covered on television with a highlights package of each tournament shown on Sky Sports in the United Kingdom. The tour had also agreed to various broadcast deals with international partners such as DAZN, Fox Sports Australia and Sky NZ.

Alumni
PGA EuroPro Tour alumni include major champions Louis Oosthuizen and Charl Schwartzel, and European Ryder Cup players Nicolas Colsaerts, Jamie Donaldson, Ross Fisher, Tommy Fleetwood and Tyrrell Hatton and Oliver Wilson.

Order of Merit winners

Notes

References

External links
Official site

Professional golf tours
Golf in the United Kingdom
European international sports competitions